Cloverdale (also known as Cloverdale Church and Gibson) is an unincorporated community in Pleasants County, West Virginia, United States.

References

Unincorporated communities in Pleasants County, West Virginia
Unincorporated communities in West Virginia